This is a list of German football transfers in the winter 2012–13 transfer window by club. Only transfers of the Bundesliga, and 2. Bundesliga are included.

Bundesliga

Note: Flags indicate national team as has been defined under FIFA eligibility rules. Players may hold more than one non-FIFA nationality.

Borussia Dortmund

In:

Out:

FC Bayern Munich

In: 

Out:

FC Schalke 04

In:

Out:

Borussia Mönchengladbach

In:

Out:

Bayer 04 Leverkusen

In:

Out:

VfB Stuttgart

In:

Out:

Hannover 96

In:

Out:

VfL Wolfsburg

In:

Out:

Werder Bremen

In:

Out:

1. FC Nürnberg

In:

Out:

TSG 1899 Hoffenheim

In:

Out:

SC Freiburg

In:

Out:

1. FSV Mainz 05

In:

Out:

FC Augsburg

In:

Out:

Hamburger SV

In:

Out:

SpVgg Greuther Fürth

In:

Out:

Eintracht Frankfurt

In:

Out:

Fortuna Düsseldorf

In:

Out:

2. Bundesliga

Hertha BSC

In:

Out:

1. FC Köln

In:

Out:

1. FC Kaiserslautern

In:

Out:

FC St. Pauli

In:

Out:

SC Paderborn 07

In:

Out:

TSV 1860 Munich

In:

Out:

1. FC Union Berlin

In:

Out:

Eintracht Braunschweig

In:

Out:

Dynamo Dresden

In:

Out:

MSV Duisburg

In:

Out:

VfL Bochum

In:

Out:

FC Ingolstadt 04

In:

Out:

FSV Frankfurt

In:

Out:

Energie Cottbus

In:

Out:

FC Erzgebirge Aue

In:

Out:

SV Sandhausen

In:

Out:

VfR Aalen

In:

Out:

Jahn Regensburg

In:

Out:

See also
 2012–13 Bundesliga
 2012–13 2. Bundesliga

References

External links
 Official site of the DFB 
 kicker.de 
 Official site of the Bundesliga 
 Official site of the Bundesliga 

German
Trans
2012-13